Bongo is a small town and is the capital of Bongo district, a district in the Upper East Region of north Ghana, adjacent to the border with Burkina Faso.

References

Populated places in the Upper East Region